The Augusta County Courthouse is a two-story, red brick, public building in Staunton, Virginia. It was listed on the National Register of Historic Places (NRHP) in 1982. It was designed by T.J. Collins, and construction ended in the Autumn of 1901. It is located in the Beverley Historic District.  It is the fifth court house constructed on the site, the first having been a log building constructed in 1755.

The building has a two-story, four-bay central portico, with one-bay hyphens connecting to one-bay wings on either side, a domed cupola, with extensive ornamentation on the pediments and the capitals of the yellow, pressed brick columns. The entrances are on the hyphens, rather than the central pavilion, with a stone belt course around the entire structure. Design follows the Beaux Arts architectural style.

Its historical significance is in its unique architecture, as well as its history and records, some dating back to the Colonial era.

References

Courthouses on the National Register of Historic Places in Virginia
Government buildings completed in 1901
Courthouses in Virginia
Beaux-Arts architecture in Virginia
National Register of Historic Places in Staunton, Virginia
Buildings and structures in Staunton, Virginia
Individually listed contributing properties to historic districts on the National Register in Virginia
Tourist attractions in Staunton, Virginia